Saahil Prem (born 23 August) is an Indian Bollywood actor, director, writer and DJ/composer. He is best known for playing the lead opposite Sunny Leone in Ragini MMS 2 and Directing/Writing and Acting in one of India's first Dance Film's Mad About Dance.

Personal life
Born in Chembur, Saahil went to St. Peter's School, Panchgani, a boarding school in Panchgani. He then attended Sheffield Hallam University. He became the resident DJ for his University.

Career 
He moved to London where he took up residency at one of the best Asian clubs (Mangos) in London. After playing at clubs and events across Europe, Saahil moved to Mumbai and did a three month acting course at Actor Prepares. He then joined Vipul Shah as his assistant for the film Namastey London. He decided to start writing his dance film Mad About Dance, which he also directed and acted in as the male lead opposite Amrit Maghera. He also played the lead opposite Sunny Leone in Balaji’s Ragini MMS 2. Saahil released his first single, a progressive track called 'The Tour' on iTunes and other digital platforms.

Filmography

References

External links
 

21st-century Indian male actors
Indian male film actors
Male actors from Mumbai
Living people
Year of birth missing (living people)